Elias Lindo was a British Sephardic Jewish merchant, author and historian.

Early Life 
He was born in London in 1783.

His father, Moses Lindo, was a sworn broker on the Royal Exchange in London and President of the Board of Deputies of British Jews.

Career 
He spent the first half of his life in the island of Saint Thomas, Danish West Indies where he was a leading merchant and president of the Synagogue. 

He was the first Junior Warden of Harmonic Lodge 356 EC in St. Thomas. 

He settled in England about 1832 and became an author and historian. He published calendars in 1832 and 1860, with an essay on the structure of the Jewish calendar, tables and general information.

In 1842 he published a translation of the "Conciliador" of Manasseh ben Israel. In 1849 he published "History of the Jews if Spain and Portugal".

He was warden of Bevis Marks Synagogue several times warden and published a catalogue of the works in its library.

References

1783 births
British writers
British merchants
British historians
British Jews
Year of death missing